The 2021 San Jose State Spartans football team represented San José State University in the 2021 NCAA Division I FBS football season. The Spartans were led by fifth–year head coach Brent Brennan and played their home games at CEFCU Stadium. They were members of the West Division of the Mountain West Conference.

Linebacker Kyle Harmon ranked second nationally with 133 total tackles (72 unassisted, 61 assisted) during the 2021 season.

Previous season

The Spartans finished the 2020 season with a 7-1 overall record and were undefeated in conference play.  They played in the conference championship game against Boise State, winning 34-20.   This was the Spartans’ first championship as members of the Mountain West Conference, and their first conference championship since winning the Big West Conference championship in 1991.  They were invited to play in the Arizona Bowl and lost to Ball State 34-13.

Schedule

Rankings

References

San Jose State
San Jose State Spartans football seasons
San Jose State Spartans football